"Talk & Talk" is a song recorded by South Korean girl group Fromis 9. It was released as a special single album on September 1, 2021, through Pledis Entertainment. The song was written by Danke (Lalala Studio), composed by Andreas Carlsson, Denzil Remedios, Ryan S. Jhun, Anna Timgren, Stephen Stahl, and arranged by Remedios and Jhun.

Background and release 
On August 24, 2021, the official Fromis 9 social media accounts uploaded a teaser photo confirming that the group would be released new single on September 1 titled "Talk & Talk". It marked Fromis 9's first release after being transferred from Off the Record Entertainment to Pledis Entertainment on August 16. On August 24 and 25, concept photos of the girls were released. Teaser videos for "Talk & Talk" were released on August 29 and 30. On September 1, the single album and its accompanying music video were released.

Charts

Accolades

Release history

References 

2021 songs
2021 singles
Hybe Corporation singles
Korean-language songs
Single albums